The Thracian horseman (also "Thracian Rider" or "Thracian Heros") is a recurring motif depicted in reliefs of the Hellenistic and Roman periods in the Balkans—mainly Thrace, Macedonia, Thessaly and Moesia—roughly from the 3rd century BC to the 3rd century AD. Inscriptions found in Romania identify the horseman as Heros and Eros (latin transcriptions of Ἥρως) and also Herron and Eron (latin transcriptions of Ἥρων), apparently the word heros used as a proper name. He is sometimes addressed in inscriptions merely as κύριος, δεσπότης or ἥρως.
Inscriptions from Bulgaria give the names Salenos and Pyrmerula/Pirmerula.

The Thracian horseman is  depicted as a hunter on horseback, riding from left to right. Between the horse's hooves is depicted either a hunting dog or  a boar. In some instances, the dog is replaced by a lion. Its depiction is in the tradition of the funerary steles of Roman cavalrymen, with the addition of syncretistic elements from Hellenistic and  Paleo-Balkanic  religious or mythological tradition.

Late Roman syncretism
The Cult of the Thracian horseman was especially important in Philippi, where the Heros had the epithets of soter (saviour) and epekoos "answerer of prayers". Funerary stelae depicting the horseman belong to the middle or lower classes (while the upper classes preferred the depiction of banquet scenes).

The motif most likely represents a composite figure, a Thracian heroes possibly based on Rhesus, the Thracian king mentioned in the Iliad, to which Scythian, Hellenistic and possibly other elements had been added.

Under the Roman Emperor Gordian III the god on horseback appears on coins minted at Tlos, in neighboring Lycia, and at Istrus, in the province of Lower Moesia, between Thrace and the Danube.

In the Roman era, the "Thracian horseman" iconography is further syncretised. The rider is now sometimes shown as approaching a tree entwined by a serpent, or as approaching a goddess. These motifs are partly of Greco-Roman and partly of possible Scythian origin. The motif of a horseman with his right arm raised advancing towards a seated female figure  is related to Scythian iconographic tradition. It is frequently found in Bulgaria, associated with Asclepius and Hygeia.

Stelai dedicated to the Thracian Heros Archegetas have been found at Selymbria.

Epithets
Apart from syncretism with other deities (such as Asclepios, Apollo, Sabatius), the figure of the Thracian Horseman was also found with several epithets: Karabasmos, Keilade(i)nos, Manimazos, Aularchenos, Aulosadenos, Pyrmeroulas. One in particular was  found in Avren, dating from the III century CE, with a designation that seems to refer to horsemanship: Outaspios, and variations Betespios, Ephippios and Ouetespios.

Related imagery

Twin horsemen
Related to the Dioscuri motif is the so-called "Danubian Horsemen" motif of two horsemen flanking a standing goddess. These "Danubian horsemen" are thus called due to their reliefs being found in the Roman province of Danube. However, some reliefs have also been found in Roman Dacia - which gives the alternate name for the motif: "Dacian Horseman". Scholarship locates its diffusion across Moesia, Dacia, Pannonia and Danube, and, to a lesser degree, in Dalmatia and Thracia.

The motif of a standing goddess flanked by two horsemen, identified as Artemis flanked by the Dioscuri, and a tree entwined by a serpent flanked by the Dioscuri on horseback was transformed into a motif of a single horseman approaching the goddess or the tree.

Pahonia
Pahonia, the national symbol of various Central-Eastern European states since ca. 12th century, may be related.

Madara Rider
The Madara Rider, is an early medieval large rock relief carved on the Madara Plateau east of Shumen in northeastern Bulgaria. The monument is dated in the c. 7th/8th century, during the reign of Bulgar Khan Tervel. In 1979 became enlisted on the UNESCO World Heritage List.

Other, similar figures
The motif of the Thracian horseman is not to be confused with the depiction of a rider slaying a barbarian enemy on funerary stelae, as on the Stele of Dexileos, interpreted as depictions of a heroic episode from the life of the deceased.

The motif of the Thracian horseman was continued in Christianised form in the equestrian iconography of both Saint George and Saint Demetrius.

Gallery
Hunter motif

Serpent-and-tree

Rider and goddess

Greco-Roman comparanda

Medieval comparanda

See also

Uastyrdzhi
Tetri Giorgi
Sabazios
Bellerophon
Jupiter Column
Pahonia
Heros Peninsula in Antarctica is named after the Thracian Horseman.

References

Bibliography 

 Dumitru Tudor, Christopher Holme (trans.), Corpus Monumentorum Religionis Equitum Danuvinorum (CMRED) (1976)
 Dimitrova, Nora. "Inscriptions and Iconography in the Monuments of the Thracian Rider." Hesperia: The Journal of the American School of Classical Studies at Athens 71, no. 2 (2002): 209-29. Accessed June 26, 2020. www.jstor.org/stable/3182007.

 R. F. Hoddinott. (1963). Early Byzantine Churches in Macedonia & Southern Serbia Google Books
 Irina Nemeti, Sorin Nemeti, Heros Equitans in the Funerary Iconography of Dacia Porolissensis. Models and Workshops. In: Dacia LVIII, 2014, p. 241-255, http://www.daciajournal.ro/pdf/dacia_2014/art_10_nemeti_nemeti.pdf

Further reading

 Boteva, Dilyana. "À propos des "secrets" du Cavalier thrace". In: Dialogues d'histoire ancienne, vol. 26, n°1, 2000. pp. 109-118. [DOI: https://doi.org/10.3406/dha.2000.2414] ; www.persee.fr/doc/dha_0755-7256_2000_num_26_1_2414
 Bottez, Valentin; Topoleanu, Florin. "A New Relief of the Thracian Horseman from Halmyris". In: Peuce (Serie Nouă) - Studii şi cercetari de istorie şi arheologie n. 19, XIX/2021, pp. 135-142.
 DIMITROVA, Nora; CLINTON, Kevin. "Chapter 2. A new bilingual votive monument with a “Thracian rider” relief". In: Studies in Greek epigraphy and history in honor of Stefen V. Tracy [en ligne]. Pessac: Ausonius Éditions, 2010 (généré le 29 juin 2021). Disponible sur Internet: <http://books.openedition.org/ausonius/2108>. . DOI: https://doi.org/10.4000/books.ausonius.2108.
 Grbić, Dragana. "The Thracian Hero on the Danube: New Interpretation of an Inscription from Diana". In: Balcanica, 2013, XLIV, 7-20. DOI: 10.2298/BALC1344007G
 Kirov, Slavtcho. "Sur la datation du culte du Cavalier thrace" [On the dating of the cult of the Thracian horseman]. In: Studia Academica Šumenensia 7 (2020): 172-186.
 Krykin, S.M. "A Votive Bas-Relief of a Thracian Horseman From the Poltava Museum". In: Ancient Civilizations from Scythia to Siberia 2, 3 (1996): 283-288. doi: https://doi.org/10.1163/157005795X00164
 Mackintosh, Majorie Carol (1992). The divine horseman in the art of the western Roman Empire. PhD thesis. The Open University. pp. 132-159.
 Szabó, Csaba. "BEYOND ICONOGRAPHY. NOTES ON THE CULT OF THE THRACIAN RIDER IN APULUM". In: Studia Universitatis Babes-Bolyai - Historia n. 1, 61/2016, pp. 62-73.
 Toporov, V. "The Thracian Horseman in an Indo-European Perspective". In: ORPHEUS. Journal of Indo-European and Thracian Studies 18 (1990): 46-63.

On the "Danubian Horsemen" or "Danubian Riders":
 Bondoc, Dorel. "The representation of Danubian Horsemen from Ciupercenii Vechi, Dolj County". In: La Dacie et l´Empire romain. Mélanges d´épigraphie et d´archéologie offerts à Constantin C. Petolescu. Eds. M. Popescu, I. Achim, F. Matei-Popescu. București: 2018, pp. 229-257.
 Gočeva, Zlatozara. "Encore une Fois sur la “Déesse de Razgrad” et les Plus Anciens des “Cavaliers Danubiens”" [Again on the “Goddess from Razgrad” and the Most Ancient “Danube Horsemen”]. In: Thracia 19 (2011): 149-157.
 Hadiji, Maria Vasinca. "CULTUL CAVALERILOR DANUBIENI: ORIGINI SI DENUMIRE (I)" [THE WORSHIP OF THE DANUBIAN HORSEMEN: ORIGINS AND DESIGNATION (I)]. In: Apulum n. 1, 43/2006, pp. 253-267. 
 Kremer, Gabrielle. "Some remarks about Domnus/Domna and the ‚Danubian Riders‘. In: S. Nemeti; E. Beu-Dachin; I. Nemeti; D. Dana (Hrsg.). The Roman Provinces. Mechanisms of Integration. Cluj-Napoca, 2019. pp. 275–290.
 Nemeti, Sorin; Cristean, Ștefana. "New Reliefs Plaques from Pojejena (Caraș-Severin county) depicting the Danubian Riders". In: Ziridava. Studia Archaeologica n. 1, 34/2020. pp. 277-286.
 Strokova, Lyudmila; Vitalii Zubar, and Mikhail Yu Treister. "Two Lead Plaques with a Depiction of a Danubian Horseman from the Collection of the National Museum of the History of the Ukraine". In: Ancient Civilizations from Scythia to Siberia 10, 1-2 (2004): 67-76. doi: https://doi.org/10.1163/1570057041963949
 Szabó, Ádám. Domna et Domnus. CONTRIBUTIONS TO THE CULT-HISTORY OF THE ’DANUBIAN-RIDERS’ RELIGION. Hungarian Polis Studies 25, Phoibos Verlag, Wien, 2017. .
 Tudor, D. Corpus monumentorum religionis equitum danuvinorum (CMRED). Volume 1: Monuments. Leiden, The Netherlands: Brill. 24 Aug. 2015 [1969]. doi: https://doi.org/10.1163/9789004294745
 Tudor, D. Corpus monumentorum religionis equitum danuvinorum (CMRED). Volume 2: Analysis and Interpretation of the Monuments; Leiden, The Netherlands: Brill, 24 Aug. 2015 [1976]. doi: https://doi.org/10.1163/9789004294752

3rd century BC in art
Hellenistic art
Greek war deities
Horses in art
Thracian religion
Serbia in the Roman era
Bulgaria in the Roman era
Dacia
Reliefs
Iconography
Supernatural beings identified with Christian saints